James Rodney Fletcher (born 23 September 1945) is an English former professional footballer who scored 60 goals from 201 games in the Football League playing as a centre forward for Crewe Alexandra, Lincoln City, Scunthorpe United and Grimsby Town.

Career
Fletcher was born in Preston, Lancashire. He played for Nelson in the Lancashire Combination before turning professional with Leeds United in 1962. After two years playing for Leeds' junior teams he began a teacher training course, and in his final year played for Crewe Alexandra where he made his debut in the Football League. Fletcher signed on a part-time basis for Lincoln City while working in his first teaching post in nearby Grimsby. He scored regularly for the reserves but only established himself in the first team towards the end of the 1968–69 season. The following year he was the club's top scorer with 17 goals in all competitions and played in every game.

When managerial changes left Fletcher out of favour, he joined Scunthorpe United in 1971 for a £3,000 fee, to replace Kevin Keegan who had joined Liverpool. Still combining his football and teaching careers, Fletcher was ever-present in the 1971–72 season. His 19 goals helped Scunthorpe to the Third Division title and made him the club's leading scorer, a feat he repeated the following season, though with only 10 goals as they were relegated. He finished his professional career with two injury-hit seasons at Grimsby Town, going on to play non-League football for Immingham Town, which he also managed, and Louth United.

References

1945 births
Living people
Footballers from Preston, Lancashire
English footballers
Association football forwards
Nelson F.C. players
Leeds United F.C. players
Crewe Alexandra F.C. players
Lincoln City F.C. players
Scunthorpe United F.C. players
Grimsby Town F.C. players
Immingham Town F.C. players
Louth United F.C. players
English Football League players
English football managers